Bab Goruiyeh (also Romanized as Bāb Gorūīyeh; also known as Bāb Gorūh) is a village in Hoseynabad-e Goruh Rural District, Rayen District, Kerman County, Kerman Province, Iran. At the 2006 census, its population was 21, in 7 families.

References 

Populated places in Kerman County